Henry Field may refer to:

Politicians
Henry F. Field (1843–1932), Vermont banker and political figure
Henry Augustus Field (1852–1899), Liberal Party Member of Parliament in New Zealand

Scholars
Henry Field (apothecary) (1755–1837), English apothecary
Henry Ibbot Field (1797–1848), English pianist
Henry Martyn Field (minister) (1822–1907), American minister and writer
Henry Martyn Field (physician) (1837–1912), American gynecologist
Henry Field (anthropologist) (1902–1986), American anthropologist
Henry Edward Field (1903–1991), New Zealand educational psychologist, educationalist and university professor

Others
Henry Field (athlete) (1878–1944), American Olympic athlete
 Henry Field (1841–1890), businessman
 Mrs. Henry Field  (1897–1994), see Nancy Lancaster

See also
Harry Field (disambiguation)